Alexander A. Shandrowsky (Born August 1, 1950) is a former American labor union leader from Baltimore, Maryland. He was elected President of the Marine Engineers Beneficial Association, AFL-CIO in 1995 and served in that position until 1998.

Sources
Fairplay, Fairplay Publications Ltd. (1997) p. 15  
Famighetti, Robert (ed). World Almanac and Book of Facts. World Almanac Books (1999) p. 153. 

1950 births
Living people
American trade union leaders
Activists from Maryland
People from Baltimore